The Venice Short Line was a Pacific Electric interurban railway line in Los Angeles which traveled from downtown Los Angeles to Venice, Ocean Park, and Santa Monica via Venice Boulevard.

History
The part of the line from the Hill Street station to Vineyard was originally built in 1897 by the Pasadena and Pacific Electric Railway Company. The line from Vineyard to Venice was constructed in 1903 by Los Angeles-Pacific Railroad (LAP). A controlling interest in LAP was sold to Southern Pacific interests in 1906, whereupon the track gauge was converted from 42 inch to standard. In 1911, LAP was consolidated into the new Pacific Electric Railway, which operated the line until rail service ended on December 28, 1950. The route was thereupon converted to motor coach operations. All rails had been removed or paved over by 1981.

Route
The line originated in Downtown Los Angeles at the Subway Terminal Building. The Red Cars exited the station at ground level directly on to Hill Street. The dual tracks ran south in the middle of Hill Street crossing major intersections such as 6th Street, Olympic Boulevard, and Pico Boulevard until the line turned west onto Venice Boulevard. 

On Venice Boulevard the dual tracks located in the middle of the paved street continued westerly passing major streets such as Figueroa, Hoover, and Vermont until the Berendo Street siding track which allowed passing of other Red Cars. Upon leaving the siding the tracks continued on the middle of Venice Boulevard passing Normandie and Western until the line reached Arlington Avenue. At Arlington the tracks then entered an unpaved private right of way in the center of dual roadways which ended at Crenshaw Boulevard. From Crenshaw Boulevard the dual tracks entered another section of private way located on the north side of Venice Boulevard and continued on to Vineyard Avenue. It was here that the Sawtelle Line branched northwesterly to Beverly Hills. Westerly of Vineyard Avenue, Venice Boulevard became a split roadway with the dual tracks located on private way between the roadways. The Venice Short Line continued westerly crossing over La Cienega Boulevard passing the Helms Bakery on its way to Culver Junction which is westerly of Exposition Boulevard. It is at the Junction that the Redondo Beach via Playa del Rey Line branched southwesterly and the Santa Monica Air Line crossed. The dual tracks continued westerly from the Junction on unpaved private way in the center of Venice Boulevard passing intersections such as Overland Avenue, Sepulveda Boulevard, Centinela Avenue, Lincoln Boulevard, and Washington Boulevards. The line then crossed the Grand Canal in Venice on a concrete arch bridge and turned north onto Pacific Avenue.

The double tracks then ran on the pavement of Pacific Avenue for five blocks before entering a wide private way known then as the "Trolleyway". From windward Avenue in Venice the line followed the "Trolleyway" north, past the Ocean Park Carhouse and yard, through Ocean Park to Pico Boulevard where the "Trolleyway" ended and street running resumed directly into Ocean Avenue. The tracks then followed Ocean Avenue north to the terminus of the Venice Short Line at Broadway in Santa Monica. Following the abandonment of the line, "Trolleyway" was paved and converted into a street, today called Pacific Avenue in Venice and Neilson Way in Santa Monica.

Infrastructure

Power was provided via the Ivy Substation at 600 volts direct current.

Rolling stock
The Venice Short Line was one of the few Pacific Electric lines to utilize PCC streetcars, which served the line between February 1941 and April 1943.

See also
Streetcar suburb
List of California railroads
History of rail transportation in California

References

External links
uncanny.net Venice Short Line tour.
 The Militant's Pacific Electric Archaeology Map - old PE Streetcar lines shown on contemporary map

History of Los Angeles
Light rail in California
Pacific Electric routes
Railway lines closed in 1950
1950 disestablishments in California
Closed railway lines in the United States